Badamak (also Romanized as Bādāmak) is a village in Maviz Rural District, in the Central District of Shahriar County, Tehran Province, Iran. At the 2006 census, its population was 491, in 124 families.

References 

Populated places in Shahriar County